Welder is the fifth studio album by American country musician Elizabeth Cook. It was produced by Don Was and released on May 11, 2010 on 31 Tigers Records. The album's title is a reference to Cook's father's former occupation as a welder. Artists performing on the album include Dwight Yoakam, Rodney Crowell, Bones Hillman, and Cook's husband Tim Carroll. Welder was Cook's final album before she was forced to attend rehab for drug addiction and an eating disorder following the collapse of her marriage and death of six family members. Cook would not release another studio album until 2017.

Critical reception
Welder received mainly favorable reviews from critics, and was ranked the 23rd best album of 2010 (out of 30) by Rolling Stone.

Welder was nominated for the Album of the Year award and Song of the Year (for El Camino) at the 2011 Americana Awards and Elizabeth Cook was also nominated for Artist of the Year because of the album.

The Washington Post described the album as Cook's best yet, because it was "rawer [than her previous four albums] in all the best senses of that word."

Track listing

Personnel
 Tim Atwood - keyboards, background vocals
 Tim Carroll - banjo, electric guitar, harmonica, slide guitar, background vocals
 Matt Combs - fiddle, mandolin, strings, background vocals
 Elizabeth Cook - acoustic guitar, lead vocals, background vocals
 Rodney Crowell - background vocals
 Marco Giovino - drums, background vocals
 Bones Hillman - bass guitar, background vocals
 The Carol Lee Singers - background vocals
 Gary Maurer - acoustic guitar
 Buddy Miller - background vocals
 Tony Paoletta - steel guitar, background vocals
 Dwight Yoakam - background vocals

Chart performance

References

Elizabeth Cook albums
2010 albums
Albums produced by Don Was